Brachodes flagellatus is a moth of the family Brachodidae which is endemic to Tibet.

References

Moths described in 2002
Endemic fauna of Tibet
Brachodidae